The Czech Afghanistan Contingent or Kontingent speciálních sil (KSS) is a joint military force of the Czech Armed Forces deployed mainly in the southern region of Afghanistan in Kandahar province, Nangarhar province and Helmand province. Czech combat forces were in Afghanistan several times - in 2004, 2006, 2008-2009 and in 2011-2012. The Czech fighting unit serving in Afghanistan was the 601st Special Forces Group (601. skupina speciálních sil). In addition to Czech combat units in Afghanistan to work as field hospitals, engineer units and police and military instructors to help train the Afghan police and army.

Deployment Units 
601. skupina speciálních sil (601st Special Forces Group) - special forces
6. polní nemocnice - field hospital
7. polní nemocnice - field hospital
11. polní nemocnice - field hospital
3. vrtulníková jednotka - helicopter unit
5. vrtulníková jednotka - helicopter unit
6. vrtulníková jednotka - helicopter unit
7. vrtulníková jednotka - helicopter unit

Size
Combat forces:

Non-Combat forces:

References

Military units and formations of the Czech Republic
International Security Assistance Force units and formations (Afghanistan)
Military units and formations disestablished in 2012